"It's Only Love" is a single by American country music artist Jeannie Seely.  Released in September 1966, it was the second single released on Monument Records and the second issued on her album The Seely Style. The single reached #15 on the Billboard Magazine Hot Country Singles chart.

Chart performance

References 

1966 singles
Jeannie Seely songs
Songs written by Hank Cochran
1966 songs
Monument Records singles
Song recordings produced by Fred Foster